The 1981 Michigan State Spartans football team represented Michigan State University in the 1981 Big Ten Conference football season. In their second season under head coach Muddy Waters, the Spartans compiled a 5–6 overall record (4–5 against Big Ten opponents) and finished in a tie for sixth place in the Big Ten Conference.

Four Spartans were recognized by the Associated Press (AP) and/or the United Press International (UPI) as first-team players on the 1981 All-Big Ten Conference football team: center Tom Piette (AP-2; UPI-1); linebacker Carl Banks (AP-2; UPI-1); defensive back Jim Burroughs (AP-2; UPI-1); and placekicker Morten Andersen (AP-1; UPI-1). Several Michigan State players ranked among the Big Ten leaders, including the following:
 Placekicker Morten Andersen led the conference with 15 field goals made and a 75.0 field goal percentage.
 Quarterback Bryan Clark ranked third in the conference with a 128.9 passing efficiency rating, fourth with a 53.4% pass completion percentage and seventh with 1,521 passing yards. 
 Running back Aaron Roberts ranked seventh in the conference with 4.9 yards per carry and 10th with 461 rushing yards.
 Ted Jones ranked sixth in the conference with 44 receptions and ninth with 624 receiving yards.
 Daryl Turner ranked eighth in the conference with 653 receiving yards.

Schedule

References

Michigan State
Michigan State Spartans football seasons
Michigan State Spartans football